The 1933–34 Rugby Football League season was the 39th season of rugby league football. The first rugby league club in London, London Highfield competed in its inaugural season.

Season summary

Wigan won their fourth Championship when they beat Salford 15-3 in the play-off final.

Salford had ended the regular season as league leaders.

The Challenge Cup winners were Hunslet who beat Widnes 11-5.

Work begins at a former quarry that was being used as a waste dump at Odsal Top in Bradford after Bradford Northern sign a ten-year lease with the local council. This was to become the site of their current home ground, Odsal Stadium.

Salford won the Lancashire League, and Leeds won the Yorkshire League. Oldham beat St Helens Recs 12–0 to win the Lancashire County Cup, and York beat Hull Kingston Rovers 10–4 to win the Yorkshire County Cup.

Championship

Championship play-off

Challenge Cup

Hunslet defeated Widnes 11-5 in the final at Wembley before a crowd of 41,280.

This was Hunslet’s second Cup Final win, the first being in 1907–08, in their third Cup Final appearance.

Kangaroo Tour

August until December also saw the appearance of the Australian team in England on their 1933–34 Kangaroo Tour. Other than the three test Ashes series against Great Britain (who played under the name of England), The Kangaroos played matches against club and county representative sides as well as a non-test international against Wales and two internationals against England, the first of which was held at the Stade Pershing in Paris, the first rugby league match played in France.

The Kangaroos were captain-coach by Frank McMillan.

References

Sources
 1933-34 Rugby Football League season at wigan.rlfans.com
 The Challenge Cup at The Rugby Football League website

1933 in English rugby league
1934 in English rugby league
Northern Rugby Football League seasons